Yumen (literally, "Jade Gate,") is a city in western Gansu province, China. It is a county-level city with a population of 106,812 (2002 est.), and is part of Jiuquan "prefecture-level city" (a multi-county administrative unit). It is located on the Silk Road and is best known for its oil production.

The city's name is often confused with the Yumen Guan or Jade Gate which is the frontier-pass of ancient times, the entrance to the old Silk Roads, which was situated not far to the west of Dunhuang.

In 2014, areas of the city were sealed off after a resident died of the bubonic plague. Districts of the city which house up to 100,000 were turned into quarantine zones. The city allocated 1 million yuan to be used for emergency vaccinations.

History

The site of Yumen was brought under Chinese control around the end of the 2nd century BCE. Yumen was known as 'Huiji' in the 5th century when the area was reclaimed by the Northern Wei Dynasty (386–534/535) and was soon after renamed back to Yumen in 581. Under the Tang Dynasty (618–907), Yumen's county seat was located at Chijinzhen which is east of the  present Yumen City. The city was then under Tibetan control around 770 CE for some 70 years. After the Tang dynasty, Yumen became a part of the Western Xia (1038–1227). During the Ming dynasty (1368–1644), the area came under Tibetan control again and was only reestablished later on in the early Qing dynasty (1644–1912).

In 1939, the first oilfield in China was established at Yumen.

Administrative divisions
Yumen City is divided to 1 subdistrict, 10 towns, 2 ethnic townships and 5 others.
Subdistricts
 Xinshiqu Subdistrict

Towns

Ethnic townships
 Xiaojinwan Dongxiang Township
 Dushanzi Dongxiang  Township (

Others
 State-owned Horse Drinking Farm()
 State-owned Yellow Flower Farm Dongxiangzu Township()
 Gansu Nongken Yusheng Agricultural Company()
 Gansu Provincial Agricultural Reclamation Construction Engineering Company()
 Gansu mining area()

Economy

The overland route to Western Asia from China flourished until the end of the Tang dynasty. Furthermore, due to increased use of sea transportation, Yumen became a backwater.

There were two catalysts for Yumen's rapid revival in the 1930s and 40s. The construction of a modern highway over the old caravan route from Yumen to  Ürümqi (capital of the Uygur Autonomous Region of Xinjiang) and continuing on-wards to Kazakhstan. The railway of Yumen is the linking point of the railway line between Lanzhou (capital of Gansu) and  Ürümqi.

After the discovery of oil in the Jiuquan basin, to the north of the Qilian Mountains the city's economy was given another major push. The first oil was drilled at Laojunmiao near Yumen in 1939 where an appreciable production was achieved in 1941. Only until 1949 did large-scale development begin, and prospecting in 1950 revealed much larger reserves than had been speculated. Yumen has its own refinery but is also linked by pipeline to a refinery at Lanzhou. Other than oil drilling and refining, Yumen also has thermal and wind power-generating facilities. Manufacturing includes machinery, building materials, chemical fertilizers and process agricultural products.

China appears to be constructing 120 missile silos near Yumen.

Geography and climate 
The diurnal temperature variation reaches or exceeds  for much of the year. With monthly percent possible sunshine ranging from 67% in March to 80% in October, the city receives 3,214 hours of bright sunshine annually.

References

Populated places along the Silk Road
Cities in Gansu
Jiuquan